Andrea Grobocopatel is an Argentine economist, president of FLOR foundation and Resilencia SGR. She was a founding member of Los Grobo, an Argentine agri-business company operating in Latin America.

Early life and education 
Grobocopatel was born in 1964 in Carlos Casares, Buenos Aires. She attended the University of Buenos Aires from 1982-1985, obtaining a B.S. in Economics. At the age of 21, she co-founded Los Grobo with her father and brother.

Family 
Grobocopatel married Walter Sergio Torchio in 1988, who has been mayor of their home city Carlos Casares since 2011. They have four children.

Activities 
Grobocopatel is the chairwoman of the Foundation for Responsible Leadership and Organizations (F.L.O.R.).
F.L.O.R's activities include training courses with the objective of women reaching decision-making positions, and promoting women's financial independence. Flor Foundation organizes an annual diversity awards ceremony which gives recognition to companies who have a diverse workforce and leadership.

Grobocopatel is also a member of the Advisory Board at the Herbet Business School of the University of Miami. Grobocopatel is the director of the family business office in UADE university. She is a member of Marianne, French & Argentinian Women's Association.

Grobocopatel was an Argentine representative in the W20 forum in 2018, which forms part of the G20 summit held in Argentina, where she participated as co-chair. Grobocopatel has received recognition from various publications including Women Who Rock, and the International Finance Corporation where she was selected as one of 20 trailblazers in women's leadership.

Grobocopatel is a speaker in corporate governance, family business, gender and diversity. She has participated in various national and international conferences, including parliamentary seminars, and the World Economic Forum.

During her tenure at Los Grobo, she held the position of CFO and was a member of the board where she advocated for women's leadership and inclusion in the company.

Grobocopatel is also a Cochran Fellow of the University of Illinois and a shareholder/founder of agricultural and livestock company Ampatel. 
In 2014, she published the book, Pasión Por Hacer, which highlights her learning as a businesswoman.

In December 2018 Grobocopatel founded Resiliencia SGR, a reciprocal social guarantee company which specializes in working with women led organizations.

References 

Living people
Argentine economists
Argentine businesspeople
1964 births
Argentine women economists
University of Buenos Aires alumni
People from Buenos Aires Province